Bruce Phillip Derlin (born 28 November 1961) is a retired tennis player from New Zealand.

Derlin represented his native country at the 1988 Olympics in Seoul. There, the left-hander lost in the second round of the men's doubles competition to Australia's Darren Cahill and John Fitzgerald, while partnering Kelly Evernden.

Challenger finals

Singles (1–2)

External links
 
 
 
 

1961 births
Living people
New Zealand male tennis players
Olympic tennis players of New Zealand
Tennis players from Sydney
Tennis players at the 1988 Summer Olympics